Pankaj Chaudhary (born 15 November 1964) is an Indian politician and a Member of Parliament, Lok Sabha from Maharajganj in Uttar Pradesh.

Early life 
He was born on 15 November 1964 to Late Shri Bhagwati Prasad Chaudhary. Kurmi-sainthwar family. He has a Bachelor of Arts (BA) degree from Gorakhpur University.

Politics 
He was first elected to the 10th Lok Sabha in 1991 and then got elected to 11th Lok Sabha in 1996, 12th Lok Sabha in 1998 however, lost to Akhilesh Singh of Samajwadi Party in 1999 General elections. He later won the 2004 Lok Sabha elections.

In 2009, he lost again to the Indian National Congress candidate Harsh Vardhan from Maharajganj. In 2014, he won from the same constituency and is now a member of 16th Lok Sabha.

He became Union Minister of State (Finance) in Second Modi ministry after the Cabinet reshuffle.

Position Held 

 1989–91 :	Member, Municipal Corporation, Gorakhpur, Uttar Pradesh
 1990–91 :	Deputy Mayor, Municipal Corporation, Gorakhpur, Uttar Pradesh
 1990 onwards 	Member, Working Committee, Bharatiya Janata Party (B.J.P.)
 1991 :	Elected to 10th Lok Sabha
 1991–96 :	Member, Committee on Papers Laid on the Table & Member, Committee on Science and Technology, Environment and Forests
 1996 :	Re-elected to 11th Lok Sabha (2nd term)
 1996–97 :	Member, Committee on Communications & Member, Joint Committee on Offices of Profit
 1998 :	Re-elected to 12th Lok Sabha (3rd term)
 1998–99 :	Member, Committee on Railways; Member, Committee on Petitions & Member, Consultative Committee, Ministry of Civil Aviation
 2004 : Re-elected to 14th Lok Sabha (4th term)
	Member, Committee on Science and Technology, Environment and Forests
	Member, Committee on Members of Parliament Local Area Development Scheme
	Member, Committee on Tourism
 2007 onwards 	Member, Committee on MPLADS 
 2014 : Re-elected to 16th Lok Sabha (5th term)
 2019 : Re-elected to 17th Lok Sabha (6th term)
 2021 : Union Ministers of State for Ministry of Finance

References

External links
 Official biography from Parliament of India records

1980 births
Living people
Bharatiya Janata Party politicians from Uttar Pradesh
Lok Sabha members from Uttar Pradesh
People from Gorakhpur
Narendra Modi ministry
People from Maharajganj district
India MPs 1991–1996
India MPs 1996–1997
India MPs 1998–1999
India MPs 2004–2009
India MPs 2014–2019
India MPs 2019–present